Pain Do Ab (also Romanized as Pā’īn Do Āb) is a village in Rastupey Rural District, in the Central District of Savadkuh County, Mazandaran Province, Iran. At the 2006 census, its population was 122, in 37 families.

References 

Populated places in Savadkuh County